is a former Japanese football player. He played for Japan national team.

Club career
Matsui was born in Takatsuki on January 4, 1961. After graduating from Osaka University of Health and Sport Sciences, he joined Nippon Kokan (later NKK) in 1983. From 1985, the club won the 2nd place for 3 years in a row and won the champions 1987 JSL Cup. In 1992, he moved to Shimizu S-Pulse joined new league J.League. He retired in 1993.

National team career
On May 31, 1984, Matsui debuted for Japan national team against China. In 1985, he played as regular goalkeeper at 1986 World Cup qualification. He also played at 1986 Asian Games and 1988 Summer Olympics qualification. He played 15 games for Japan until 1988.

Club statistics

National team statistics

References

External links
 
 Japan National Football Team Database

1961 births
Living people
Osaka University of Health and Sport Sciences alumni
Association football people from Osaka Prefecture
Japanese footballers
Japan international footballers
Japan Soccer League players
J1 League players
NKK SC players
Shimizu S-Pulse players
Footballers at the 1986 Asian Games
Association football goalkeepers
Asian Games competitors for Japan